Weese may refer to:

Places 
Weese, Randolph County, West Virginia
Weese, Webster County, West Virginia

People with the name Weese
Ben Weese (born 1929), American architect
Harry Weese (1915–1998), American architect
John Aaron Weese (1891–1981), Canadian politician
Miranda Weese, American ballet dancer
Norris Weese (1951–1995), American football player